Eva Yolanda Machuca Villasana (born 14 January 1970) is a Mexican racewalker. She competed in the women's 10 kilometres walk at the 1992 Summer Olympics.

References

1970 births
Living people
Athletes (track and field) at the 1992 Summer Olympics
Mexican female racewalkers
Olympic athletes of Mexico
Place of birth missing (living people)